Konstantinos Pantazis (born 1915) was a Greek athlete. He competed in the men's high jump at the 1936 Summer Olympics.

References

External links
  

1915 births
Year of death missing
Athletes (track and field) at the 1936 Summer Olympics
Greek male high jumpers
Olympic athletes of Greece
Athletes from Athens